This is list of archives in Denmark.

Archives in Denmark 

 Danish National Archives
 Danish Emigration Archives

Former archives 
The following archives have since been integrated into the Danish National Archives:
 Danish National Business Archives
 Danish Data Archive
 Provincial Archives of Funen
 Provincial Archives of Northern Jutland
 Provincial Archives of Southern Jutland
 Provincial Archives of Zealand

See also 

 List of archives
 List of museums in Denmark
 Culture of Denmark

External links 

 
Archives
Denmark
Archives